Ermes is a personal name. Notable people with this name include:
 Ali Omar Ermes, artist, writer and community activist
 Ermes di Colorêt (1622–1692), Italian count and writer
 Ermes Bentivoglio (1475–1513), Italian condottiero
 Ernest Borgnine, (1917–2012), American actor
 Ermes Borsetti (1913–2005), Italian footballer
 Ermes Costello, fictional character
 Ermes Muccinelli (1927–1994), Italian footballer
 Ermes Paterlini (born 1947), Italian footballer

Italian masculine given names